An animated narrative vignette (ANV) is an instructional technology used to motivate and facilitate role-playing, problem solving, and discussion. Teachers develop the ANVs to present in class or in online training. Students might also create them in experiential learning exercises. 

Teachers provide computer animation representations of teachable situations that encourage critical thinking and may also provide an instrument for assessing attitudes and behaviors. Vignettes have been used to teach mathematics and science, management skills, problem solving, and character education.

See also
Digital puppetry
Educational technology
Role play simulation

References
 Tettegah, S. (2005). Technology, Narratives, Vignettes, and the Intercultural and Cross-Cultural Teaching Portal. Urban education, 40(4), 368–393.
 Bailey, B.P., Tettegah, S.Y. Bradley, T.J. (2006, in press). Clover: Connecting Technology and Character Education Using Personally-Constructed Animated Vignettes. Interacting with Computers. 
 Campbell, P.B. (1996) How Would I Handle That? Using Vignettes to Promote Good Math and Science Education. American Association for the Advancement of Science.
 Chau, J., A. Chang, I. Lee, W. Ip, D. Lee and Y. Wootton. (2001) Effects of Using Videotaped Vignettes on Enhancing Students' Critical Thinking Ability in a Baccelaureate Nursing Programme. J. Advanced Nursing, 36(1), 112–119.

External links
Clover ANV Authoring Tool
Q-NEX Smart Campus Solution

Pedagogy
Educational technology